Keto and Kote (Georgian: ქეთო და კოტე) is a 1948 Georgian comedy film directed by Vakhtang Tabliashvili and Shalva Gedevanishvili is based on play Hanuma by Avksenty Tsagareli.

Plot 
The rich merchant of Tbilisi dreams of intermarrying with the aristocracy (in order to be known as an aristocrat himself) and is going to give his beautiful daughter Keto (Medea Japaridze) for the old, vicious and ruined prince Levan Palavandishvili (Petre Amiranashvili). The girl is desperate, because she loves the young poet Kote (Batu Kraveishvili), the nephew of the prince, who, in the guise of a teacher, goes to see her.

With the help of friends and matchmaker Khanuma (Tamari Chavchavadze), young lovers manage to outwit old people and achieve their own happiness.

Cast
 Medea Japaridze as Keto
 Batu Kraveishvili as Kote 
 Tamari Chavchavadze as Khanuma
 Meri Davitashvili as Qabato
 Shalva Gambashidze as Makari
 Veriko Anjaparidze as princess
 Petre Amiranashvili as Levan
 Tamari Tsitsishvili as Nino
 Vaso Godziashvili as Siko
 Giorgi Shavgulidze as Niko
 Sergo Zakariadze

Release 
Vakhtang Tabliashvili's film  watched 22.7 million viewers, which is 764 results in the history of Soviet film distribution.

See  also
 Khanuma

References

External links 
 

1948 films
1940s Russian-language films
Georgian-language films
Soviet films based on plays
1948 musical comedy films
Soviet musical comedy films
Soviet-era films from Georgia (country)
Soviet black-and-white films
1940s multilingual films
Soviet multilingual films
Multilingual films from Georgia (country)